Cosme de la Torriente y Peraza (27 June 1872 in "La Isabel" near Jovellanos, Matanzas, Cuba – 7 December 1956 in Havana, Cuba) was a Cuban soldier, politician, lawyer and statesman.

Biography
He was born on 27 June 1872.

He received his law degree from the University of Havana. When the Revolution began in 1895, Torriente was active in the revolutionary clubs of Matanzas, and in March of that year he embarked for the United States to take part in the filibustering expeditions there being organized. De la Torriente was a Colonel in the Spanish–American War. He represented the Cuban Government at the wedding of King Alfonso XIII of Spain and was conferred the Order of Isabella the Catholic. He was president of the League of Nations from 1923 until 1924. He was conferred the Order of the Legion of Honour of France after World War I.

He died on 7 December 1956 in Havana.

References

  (Spanish)

1872 births
1956 deaths
People from Matanzas Province
Foreign ministers of Cuba
Permanent Representatives of Cuba to the League of Nations
Presidents of the Assembly of the League of Nations
League of Nations people
1890s in Cuba
1900s in Cuba
1920s in Cuba
1930s in Cuba
20th-century Cuban politicians
Recipients of the Legion of Honour
Recipients of the Order of Isabella the Catholic